The Muddy River is a series of brooks and ponds that runs through sections of Boston's Emerald Necklace, including along the south boundary of Brookline, Massachusetts (a town that went by the name of Muddy River Hamlet before it was incorporated in 1705).  The river, which is narrower than most waterways designated as rivers in the United States, is a protected public recreation area surrounded by parks and hiking trails, managed by the Massachusetts Department of Conservation and Recreation.

The river flows from Jamaica Pond through Olmsted Park's Wards Pond, Willow Pond, and Leverett Pond.  It then flows through a conduit under Route 9 and into a narrow park called the Riverway, from which it flows through three culverts: the Riverway Culvert, the Brookline Avenue Culvert, and the Avenue Louis Pasteur Culvert.  The Muddy River continues from the Fens toward its connection with the Charles River via the Charlesgate area, running through a stone-paved channel surrounded by a narrow strip of parklands.  In a series of stone bridges and tunnels, it passes under Boylston Street, Massachusetts Turnpike, Commonwealth Avenue, Storrow Drive, and a series of elevated connecting ramps (the Bowker Overpass).

History

In its natural state, the outlet of the Muddy River into the tidal Charles was much wider.  It formed the eastern Brookline border with Boston and Roxbury (depending on the year), from Brookline's incorporation in 1705 until Boston's annexation of Allston–Brighton in 1873.

The present form of the river and surrounding parks was created by the Emerald Necklace project, between 1880 and 1900.  Under the direction of designer Frederick Law Olmsted, the project reclaimed marshland, creating sculpted and planted riverbanks.

The Muddy River is mentioned by John Winthrop, in his famous "Journal of John Winthrop," as the site of an unidentified flying object in March 1638 or 1639, as described to him by witness James Everell. This event is considered by some to be the first recorded instance of such occurrences.  Winthrop's friend, John Hull and Judith Quincy Hull owned the property. Judge Sewall came into possession of this tract, which embraced more than 350 acres, through Hannah Quincy Hull (Sewall) who was the Hull's only daughter. John Hull in his youth lived in Muddy River Hamlet, in a little house which stood near the Sears Memorial Church. Hull removed to Boston, where he amassed a large fortune for those days. Judge Sewall probably never lived on his Brookline estate. (http://www.brooklinehistoricalsociety.org/history/proceedings/1903/1903_Sewall.html)

Restoration

The restoration is currently being run by The Maintenance and Management Oversight Committee (MMOC), which is an “independent citizen-led oversight body for the Muddy River Restoration Project,” The master plan was originally pushed by the Boston's Parks and Recreation Department, along with the Commonwealth of Massachusetts, and the Federal Emergency Management Agency among others. United States Army Corps of Engineers was allowed to study the Muddy River thanks to the Water Resources Development Act of 1996

Phase 1 of the project aimed to create new river crossings, clearing things that blocked sunlight to the river, as well as replanting the river edge to both beautify and help build habitat for the local wildlife. Phase 1 was completed successfully in 2016 with the planting of 230 trees and daylighting of the area. According to Margaret Dyson, director of Historic Parks at Boston Parks and Recreation, Phase 2 is about dredging the river to help with reducing the damage from flooding, as well as additional work in the river itself. Phase 2 has not been welcomed with open arms however. At the presentation of Phase 2 in 2018, the Boston Landmarks Commission had an issue with a large concrete wall that was planned to be built in order to help with the flooding. The committee was not thrilled about the wall, citing the fact that they didn't want such a glaring piece of concrete next to the river. They agreed to approve the rest of the plan however, as long as the Parks Department came back to the commission with a better plan for the wall. Currently, the project is expected to resume construction in 2020.

References

External links

 Muddy River Restoration Project
 Emerald Necklace Conservancy Riverway history page

Emerald Necklace
Landforms of Boston
Rivers of Suffolk County, Massachusetts
Rivers of Massachusetts